Rosa hirtula, the sanshou-bara or Hakone rose, is a species of flowering plant in the family Rosaceae. It is found only in the vicinity of Mount Fuji and neighboring Mount Hakone in Japan, and is the town flower of Hakone. Quite unusually for a rose, it can take on a tree-like growth form.

References

hirtula
Endemic flora of Japan
Plants described in 1920